The Brampton Warriors are a pair of defunct junior ice hockey teams from Brampton, Ontario, Canada.  They were a part of the Ontario Provincial Junior A Hockey League, Central Junior B Hockey League, Metro Junior B Hockey League, and Metro Junior A League.  These two teams are the forerunners of the OPJHL's Brampton Capitals.

History
The Warriors began as Brampton Regents during the 1940s playing at the Junior B level. In 1957, the team became sponsored by a local distributor of the 7 Up soft drink. The Brampton 7Ups played in the now defunct Metro Junior A League for two seasons, 1961–62 and 1962-63. Bob Savage was their coach for both seasons. The team returned to the Metro Junior B Hockey League in 1963.

Brampton joined the Central Junior B Hockey League in 1971 during a massive Ontario Hockey Association reshuffling of the Junior "B" ranks. Prior to this, they were members of the Metro Junior B Hockey League. They are the only known member of the Metro league to be affected by the reshuffle as it was mostly done between members of the Central league and the Mid-Ontario Junior B Hockey League.

The Brampton Warriors Jr. A team were an OPJHL team for two seasons in the 1980s. Their 40-6-4 record in the second season would normally be unstoppable, however the Warriors finished in second place in 1981-82 behind a 40-4-6 Guelph Platers team that would make the jump to the Ontario Hockey League the next season. As the Warriors folded for good at the end of the season, the Platers came within arm's reach of winning the National Title.

Notable alumni
Three alumni of the Brampton 7Ups went on to play in the National Hockey League, all of them (Ken Broderick, Andy Brown, and Lyle Carter) were goaltenders playing a combined total of 106 NHL games. Although Andy Brown played in just 62 games in the NHL over the course of three seasons, he will forever be a part of NHL hockey history. Brown carries the distinction of being the last goaltender in the league to play without a protective mask, now a mandatory rule.

List of NHL alumni
Ken Broderick
Andy Brown
Lyle Carter
Frank Pietrangelo

Season-by-season results

Playoffs
1981 Lost Quarter-final
Guelph Platers defeated Brampton Warriors 4-games-to-none
1982 Lost Quarter-final
Dixie Beehives defeated Brampton Warriors 4-games-to-1

Junior B Warriors
With the renaming and promotion for the Jr. A Warriors, a farm team was created at the Junior B level to feed them. After two years, this team collapsed.

Season-by-season results

References

Defunct ice hockey teams in Canada
Ice hockey teams in Ontario
Warriors
1982 disestablishments in Ontario
1940 establishments in Ontario
Ice hockey clubs established in 1940
Ice hockey clubs disestablished in 1982